Kaduney may refer to:

Kaduney-e Olya
Kaduney-e Sofla
Kaduney-e Vosta